22740 Rayleigh, provisional designation , is a Zhongguo asteroid from the outermost region of the asteroid belt, approximately  in diameter. It was discovered on 20 September 1998, by Belgian astronomer Eric Elst at the La Silla Observatory in Chile. It is one of few asteroids located in the 2 : 1 resonance with Jupiter. The asteroid was named for English physicist and Nobel laureate Lord Rayleigh.

Orbit and classification 

Rayleigh is a non-family asteroid from the main belt's background population. It is a member of the small group of Zhongguo asteroids, located in the Hecuba gap (2 : 1 mean motion resonance with Jupiter) near 3.27 AU. Contrary to the nearby unstable Griqua group, the orbits of the Zhongguos are stable over half a billion years.

It orbits the Sun in the outer asteroid belt at a distance of 2.5–3.9 AU once every 5 years and 10 months (2,133 days; semi-major axis of 3.24 AU). Its orbit has an eccentricity of 0.21 and an inclination of 3° with respect to the ecliptic.

Physical characteristics

Diameter and albedo 

According to the survey carried out by the NEOWISE mission of NASA's Wide-field Infrared Survey Explorer, Rayleigh measures 9.819 kilometers in diameter and its surface has an albedo of 0.088.

Rotation period 

As of 2018, no rotational lightcurve of Rayleigh has been obtained from photometric observations. The body's rotation period, pole and shape remain unknown.

Naming 

This minor planet was named after English physicist John William Strutt, 3rd Baron Rayleigh (Lord Rayleigh; 1842–1919), who discovered the noble gas argon and was awarded the Nobel Prize in Physics in 1904 (also see list of laureates). The official naming citation was published by the Minor Planet Center on 1 June 2007. The lunar crater Rayleigh as well as the crater Rayleigh on Mars are also named in his honor.

References

External links 
 Asteroid Lightcurve Database (LCDB), query form (info )
 Dictionary of Minor Planet Names, Google books
 Asteroids and comets rotation curves, CdR – Observatoire de Genève, Raoul Behrend
 Discovery Circumstances: Numbered Minor Planets (20001)-(25000) – Minor Planet Center
 
 

022740
022740
Discoveries by Eric Walter Elst
Named minor planets
19980920